Your Bag is the second studio album by singer/songwriter Lida Husik, released in 1992 by Shimmy Disc.

Production
Husik worked on the album with Jamie Harley and Kramer. Husik originally intended to record an EP, but was encouraged to lengthen the songs by Kramer.

Critical reception

The Chicago Tribune called the album "stark, acoustic existentialism accented by feedback guitars." The Village Voice deemed it an "obscure [gem] of 1960s-inspired, punkily energetic, whispery songcraft." The Cincinnati Enquirer considered it to be "one of the most subtly psychedelic albums of the 1990s."

Track listing

Personnel 
Adapted from Your Bag liner notes.

Lida Husik – lead vocals, guitar, keyboards, production
Musicians
Jamie Harley – drums, percussion, additional vocals, production, engineering

Production and additional personnel
Kramer – production
Michael Macioce – photography

Release history

References

External links 
 

Lida Husik albums
1992 albums
Shimmy Disc albums
Albums produced by Kramer (musician)